The Children's Museum of Caracas (Fundación Museo de los Niños) is a museum in Caracas, Venezuela aimed at teaching children about science, technology, culture and arts. It was established by the former First Lady of Venezuela, Alicia Pietri de Caldera in 1982.

References

See also 
Caracas
Venezuela
Children's museum

Children's museums
Museums in Caracas
Foundations based in Venezuela
Museums established in 1982
1982 establishments in Venezuela
Child-related organizations in Venezuela